The Tomb of the Triclinium ) is an Etruscan tomb in the Necropolis of Monterozzi (near Tarquinia, Italy) dated to approximately 470 BC. The tomb is named after the Roman triclinium, a type of formal dining room, which appears in the frescoes of the tomb. It has been described as one of the most famous of all Etruscan tombs.

Since its discovery in 1830, the tomb's frescoes have deteriorated and lost some of their color and detail. In 1949 they were moved to the Tarquinia National Museum to conserve them. Thanks to watercolor copies made by Carlo Ruspi shortly after the tomb's discovery, it is still possible to see the frescoes in their former state. The artistic quality of the frescoes has been described as superior to many other Etruscan tombs,  and is thought that the artist who decorated the tomb was a Greek metic.

Description

The tomb consists of a single room. The fresco on the back wall shows a banquet scene, borrowed from depictions of drinking scenes on Attic red-figure pottery from the early fifth century. The banqueteers recline on three couches called klinai. On the floor under the klinai a cat prowls towards a rooster and a partridge. On the left wall three female dancers, one male dancer and a male musician with a barbiton appear. They are placed between small trees filled with birds. On the right wall a similar scene is shown. On the entry wall two youths jump down from their horses. They may be apobates or a reference to the Dioscuri as intermediaries between the earthly life and the afterlife.

The similarities between the frescoes in the Tomb of the Triclinium and Tomb 5513 (also in the Necropolis of Monterozzi) led Steingraber to conclude that they were the products of the same workshop. The strong influence of red-figure Attic vase painting has convinced some experts that the artist who decorated the tomb was a Greek metic.

See Also 

Etruscan art
Tomb of the Augurs
Tomb of the Bulls
Tomb of the Dancers
Tomb of the Diver
Tomb of the Leopards

References

External links

Images of the tomb at The Mysterious Etruscans

1830 archaeological discoveries
Triclinium